Sarah Naqvi (born 1996) is an Indian contemporary textile artist, enrolled at the De Ateliers residency program in Amsterdam, Netherlands. Their works have received international recognition, have been described as subversive, and are noted to cover topics such as gender, sexuality, race, religion, etc., while advocating for various social and feminist causes including that of body positivity and opposition to menstruation stigma.

Naqvi's embroideries have featured on various national and international art studios and exhibitions including two solo exhibitions called Bashaoor (2018) at Clark House in Mumbai, Maharashtra and Sharam o Haya (2019) at Âme Nue in Hamburg, Germany. They also have a large presence on social media platforms where her work has received widespread appraisal.

Born in Aligarh, Uttar Pradesh and brought up in suburban Mumbai, Naqvi is an alumna of the St. Xavier's College, Mumbai and a graduate of the National Institute of Design in Ahmedabad. She was the recipient of "The Phenomenal SHE" award in 2019, jointly granted by the Indian National Bar Association and the National Institute of Design.

References

External links
Official Instagram

1996 births
Living people
Indian textile artists
21st-century women textile artists
Date of birth missing (living people)
Artists from Uttar Pradesh
People from Aligarh
Women artists from Uttar Pradesh
21st-century textile artists
21st-century Indian women artists
National Institute of Design alumni
Indian embroiderers